Rima Bishwokarma (also spelled Reema) is a Nepali actress and media personality. She was born on 5 August in Bardiya, Gulariya, Nepal. Rima did her first screen time when she was in grade 6 or 7 hosting a TV program “Jada Jadye” at an early age.

Education
She did her Lower-secondary schooling from Siddhartha Vanasthali Institute, but completed her SLC from Navaratna Secondary School. Recently, she is doing bachelor third year in Mass Communication from Pinnacle Academy.

Career
Before starting her acting career, she had worked as a VJ for Nepal Television and a newscaster for National TV. She started her acting career from the music video Jindagibhar Saath Dinchhu Bhannele by Chris KC, who now has acted in more than 100 Nepali music videos.

This pretty girl Rima is highly appreciated in the Nepali music video by Shreya Ghosal’s Chayechha Basanta. Later she entered into Nepali movie industry. She debuted in the movie ‘Swor’ as an actress. The movie was released in 2011. The movie Swor directed by Prasanna Poudel under the production of MRS Movies Pvt. Ltd. Similarly, she did movies like Visa Girl, Ritu, Baato Muniko Ful 2, and so on. Rima went to Rajasthan for the shooting of a music video and also went to Australia for the shooting of the movie “Ritu”.

World recognized her from the international franchise reality show "Nepal Idol". She co-hosted "Nepal Idol" which was highly praised by the Nepali speaking people around the world. She is also the host of Nepali Comedy Reality show Comedy Champion which is the first comedy reality show in Nepal.

Filmography

References

External links